Alexia Cáceres (born 31 January 1995) is a Paraguayan team handball player. She plays for the club Nueva Estrella, and on the Paraguay national team. She represented Paraguay at the 2013 World Women's Handball Championship in Serbia, where the Paraguayan team placed 21st.

References

Paraguayan female handball players
1995 births
Living people
20th-century Paraguayan women
21st-century Paraguayan women